The Vympel NPO R-77 missile (NATO reporting name: AA-12 Adder) is a Russian active radar homing beyond-visual-range air-to-air missile. It is also known by its export designation RVV-AE. It is the Russian counterpart to the American AIM-120 AMRAAM missile.

The R-77 was marked by a severely protracted development. Work began in the 1980s, but was not completed before the Soviet Union fell. For many years, only the RVV-AE model was produced for export customers. Production was further disrupted when the Russian invasion of Ukraine resulted in a Ukrainian arms embargo against Russia, severing supply chains. The Russian Air Force finally entered the R-77-1 (AA-12B) into service in 2015. It was subsequently deployed by Su-35S fighters in Syria on combat air patrols. The export model of the R-77-1 is called RVV-SD.

Development
Work on the R-77 began in 1982. It represented Russia's first multi-purpose missile for tactical and strategic aircraft for fire-and-forget use against aircraft ranging from hovering helicopters to high-speed, low-altitude aircraft. Gennadiy Sokolovski, general designer of the Vympel Design Bureau, said that the R-77 missile can be used against medium and long range air-to-air missiles such as the AIM-120 AMRAAM and AIM-54 Phoenix, as well as SAMs such as the Patriot. The munition has a laser-triggered proximity fuze and an expanding rod warhead that can destroy targets of various sizes. It can be used against cruise missiles and precision-guided munitions (PGMs). First seen in 1992 at the Moscow Airshow (MAKS) 1992, the R-77 was immediately nicknamed Amraamski by Western journalists. The basic R-77 is known as the izdeliye 170, while the export variant is known as the izdeliye 190 or RVV-AE. Vympel did not have adequate funding during the 1990s and the first part of the following decade to support further evolution of the R-77, either for the Russian air force or the export market. The basic version of the R-77 is not thought to have entered the Russian air force inventory in significant numbers.

The R-77 can be used by upgraded Su-27, MiG-29 and MiG-31 variants in Russian Air Force service. Some variants of the Su-27 in China's People's Liberation Army Air Force, including the domestically produced J-11 variants, can also employ the missile. The newer Su-30MKK has a N001 (Su-27 radar) with a digital bypass channel incorporating a mode allowing it to use R-77s. The export RVV-AE has been sold widely, with China and India placing significant orders for the munition, as was the case for the R-73. The baseline R-77 was designed in the 1980s, with development complete by around 1994. India was the first export customer for the export variant, known as the RVV-AE, with the final batch delivered in 2002.

There are other variants under development. One has an upgraded motor to extend a range at high altitudes to as much as 120–160 km; it is known as the RVV-AE-PD (Povyshenoy Dalnosti—improved range). This variant has been test-fired and uses a solid-fuel ramjet engine. Its range puts it in the long-range class and is equivalent in range to the AIM-54 Phoenix. In another version of the R-77, a terminal infrared homing seeker is offered. This is in line with the Russian practice of attacking targets by firing pairs of missiles with different homing systems. This complicates end-game defensive actions for the target aircraft, as it needs to successfully defeat two homing systems. If a radar-guided medium-range missile is fired at an enemy jet aircraft outside the non-escape attack zone, the target aircraft may be able to escape through emergency maneuver. But at this moment, in fact, the infrared guidance has an advantage: once the jet aircraft turns to escape, the engine nozzle is exposed, and the infrared characteristics are exposed. This method of attack may not always be available as IR seekers typically have less range and less resistance to poor weather than radar seekers, which may limit the successful use of mixed seeker attacks unless the IR missile is initially directed by radar or some other means.

Another improvement program was designated the R-77M, which made the missile longer and heavier, making use of a two-stage motor as well as an improved seeker. A further product-improvement of the R-77, designated the R-77M1 and then the R-77-PD, was to feature a ramjet propulsion device. This missile was destined for the MiG 1.44 that for the MFI program. The munition has a laser fuse and an expanding rod warhead that can destroy the variable sized targets. However, due to funding shortage and eventual cancellation of the MiG 1.44, development of this model may have stopped by 1999; no information or announcement regarding the R-77M and R-77-PD has appeared since.

Further development 
Tactical Missile Weapons Corporation, also known as TRV (Takticheskoe Raketnoe Vooruzhenie – Тактическое Ракетное Вооружение), unveiled the RVV-SD and RVV-MD missiles for the first time at the Moscow Air Show (MAKS) in August 2009. The RVV-SD is an improved version of the R-77, while the RVV-MD is a variant of the R-73. The RVV-SD includes the upgrades associated with the izdeliye 170-1, or R-77-1. The RVV-SD, along with the RVV-MD, seem to be part of Russia's bid for India's medium multirole combat aircraft competition. Both designations were included by MiG on a presentation covering MiG-35 Fulcrum armament during Aero India Air Show in February. The initial RVV-SD offering is likely no more than a stopgap to try to maintain its position, and to provide a credible radar-guided weapon to offer as part of fighter export packages and upgrade programs.

Additional improvements include upgrades to the missile's radar seeker and boat tail rear section to reduce drag. Russian missile manufacturer Agat previously confirmed it was working on seeker upgrades for the R-77, implying that at least two projects were underway, one for export and one for the Russian air force.

Vympel, a which had merged to be part of TRV, has been developing a more extensive upgrade of the missile than the R-77-1. Designated the izdeliye 180, or K-77M, this missile is a mid-life upgrade for the missile and is intended to be the main medium-range missile for the Sukhoi Su-57. This upgrade aims to provide a further improvement in range, with the design including a dual-pulse motor configuration. The izdeliye 180 will use an Active electronically scanned array seeker and conventional rear fins instead of the R-77's lattice fins. This missile is intended to match the performance of the latest AIM-120 variants. Though it uses a similar designation as the earlier R-77M improvement program, it is not known if these two missiles are the same or are related.

On October 4, 2020 footage of Su-57 fighter flying with R-77M missile was revealed in a video released by the Russian Defense Ministry commemorating the 100th anniversary of the 929th Chkalov State Flight-Test Center

Design description

For the first forty years, the aerodynamics combined vestigial cruciform wings with grid fins used as tail control surfaces (similar devices are used on the OTR-23 Oka, and USAF uses them on MOAB). The flow separation which occurs at high angles of attack enhances its turning ability, giving the missile a maximum turn rate of up to 150° per second. However, the grid fins also increase drag and radar cross section. Updated variants of the R-77, such as the izdeliye 180 that is destined for the Sukhoi Su-57, will use conventional fins instead.

The missile uses a multi-function doppler-monopulse active radar seeker developed by OAO Agat. The radar features two modes of operation, over short distances, the missile will launch in an active "fire-and-forget" mode. Over longer distances the missile is controlled by an inertial guidance auto pilot with occasional encoded data link updates from the launch aircraft's radar on changes in spatial position or G of the target. As the missile comes within  of its target, the missile switches to its active radar mode. The host radar system maintains computed target information in case the target breaks the missile's lock-on.

Operational history
At the beginning of February 2016, four Su-35S were deployed to Syria as part of the Russian aerial expeditionary force to the country. Tasked with air to air duties, the Su-35S were extensively documented while armed with a couple of R-77 missiles, between IR seeking R-27T under the inner pylons and R-73 under the outer ones.

Variants

 R-77 (izdeliye 170) – Standard model.
 RVV-AE (izdeliye 190) – Export model of the R-77.
 R-77-1 (izdeliye 170-1) – Russian-built variant with a streamlined nose, 9B-1248 (Izdeliye-50-1) active radar seeker head, and new fins.
 RVV-SD – Export model of the R-77-1.
 R-77P / RVV-PE – Passive homing model.
 R-77T / RVV-TE – Infrared homing model.
 R-77-SRK – Ship-to-air variant.
 R-77-ZRK / RVV-AE-ZRK – RVV-ZRK Surface-to-air variant.
 R-77-PD / RVV-AE-PD – Ramjet model.
 R-77-PD ZRK / RVV-AE-ZRK – RVV-(PD-)ZRK Surface-to-air variant.
 K-77M (izdeliye 180) – Version under development for the Sukhoi Su-57 with AESA seeker, conventional fins, and two-pulse motor.
 K-77ME (izdeliye 180-BD) – Ramjet model of the K-77M.

Operators

Current operators
 – for the MIG-29M/M2 and Su-30MKA
 – unknown number bought in 2013
 – 300 for the MIG-29M/M2 and Su-35
 – for the Su-30MKK and Su-30MK2
  People's Liberation Army Air Force
  People's Liberation Army Naval Air Force 
 – for the MiG-21UPG, MiG-29UPG and Su-30MKI. Received 500 missiles in 2014-15, ordered 400 more in 2019
  Indian Naval Air Arm 
 – for the Su-30MK2 and Su-27SKM
 – for the Su-30SM
 – 150 missiles delivered for use on Sukhoi Su-30MKMs
 – basic variant never officially introduced in series, Su-30SMs and Su-35S' were spotted with R-77-1s when they were deployed to Syria. 2 contracts have reportedly been signed in 2015 for 13 billion rubles and in 2020 concerning modernized and import-substituted missiles for 65 billion rubles.
 – Serbia ordered 200 R-77-1 missiles for modernized MiG-29s
 – for the MiG-29SE
 – for the MiG-29SM

 – 100 missiles ordered for Su-30MK2s
 – for the Su-30MK2
 – 100 missiles delivered by 2005 for MiG-29SMs

Former operators
 – used for a short time on MiG-29s

See also
List of missiles
AAM-4
Astra Mark 1
Python (missile)
Meteor (missile)
PL-12
PL-15
PL-21
AIM-120 AMRAAM
Long-Range Engagement Weapon

References
Citations

Bibliography

 

Air-to-air missiles of Russia
Air-to-air missiles of the Soviet Union
Cold War air-to-air missiles of the Soviet Union
Vympel NPO products
Military equipment introduced in the 2000s
Fire-and-forget weapons